Obršani is a village in Municipality of Krivogaštani, North Macedonia.

Demographics
According to the 2002 census, the village had a total of 793 inhabitants. Ethnic groups in the village include:

Macedonians 793

Sports
The local football club FK Partizan has played in North Macedonia's second tier.

References

Villages in Krivogaštani Municipality